Dolichandrone alba, also known as indani or tsanie, is a small deciduous shrub or small tree in the family Bignoniaceae. It is endemic to southern Mozambique.

Description
This species may reach heights of 3-12 m. The flowers are white, and it is commonly found in sandy soils within coastal environments.

Gallery

References

External links

Endemic flora of Mozambique
alba
Plants described in 1909